The following is a list of episodes for the television series Mayberry R.F.D.

Series overview

Episodes

Pilot (1968)

"No. in series" and "No. in season" for the pilot dictate the airing and location of the episode within the parent series.

Season 1 (1968–69)

Season 2 (1969–70)

Season 3 (1970–71)

References

Mayberry R.F.D.
The Andy Griffith Show